Smosh is an American YouTube sketch comedy-improv collective, production company, and former social networking site founded by Anthony Padilla (all assets) and Ian Hecox (comedy group only). In 2002, Padilla created a website named "smosh.com" for making Flash animations, and he was later joined by Hecox. They began to post videos on Smosh's YouTube channel in the autumn of 2005 and quickly became one of the most popular channels on the site. , the Smosh channel has over 10 billion views and over 25 million subscribers.

Since 2012, the Smosh brand has expanded to consist of multiple channels, including a Spanish-language channel (ElSmosh), a channel focused on gaming content (Smosh Games), and a variety channel (Smosh Pit). The sketches have also included more actors. Padilla left Smosh in June 2017 to pursue independent ventures. The Smosh channel has experienced three different spans as the most subscribed YouTube channel. The first period spanned from May to June 2006, the second from April 2007 to September 2008, and the third span from January to August 2013.

On November 6, 2018, Smosh's parent company Defy Media abruptly closed without warning. Six days later, the Smosh cast released a video announcing that production of Smosh, Smosh Pit, and Smosh Games content was still ongoing, and that existing videos would be finished and other content would be released independently by Smosh on their YouTube channels. They subsequently joined Mythical Entertainment after their company was purchased by Rhett & Link on February 22, 2019. As of 2019, the channel's regular cast consists of Hecox, Courtney Miller, Damien Haas, Olivia Sui, Keith Leak Jr., Noah Grossman and Shayne Topp, who run the majority of its content. Anthony Padilla founded Pressalike Inc. in 2020. As a result of Padilla creating Smosh Productions to safeguard Smosh from incidents like these (and because the company owns Smosh but Mythical owned the YouTube channel), his production company automatically owns Smosh Productions, making Mythical an MCN for Smosh's management, funding, and promotion. Thus ending Mythical's short-lived ownership of Smosh.

History

2002–2006: Formation and lip sync videos 

The franchise began when Anthony Padilla built a website in 2002, smosh.com, and made several different Flash animations. He has stated that the name "Smosh" came from an incident where he mistook a friend explaining a mosh pit as a "smosh pit". Other content creators in the pre-YouTube era would also upload videos to smosh.com, including future YouTuber TomSka. Later, his friend, Ian Hecox, joined the venture. Padilla and Hecox first met in their sixth grade science class. They became friends, and quickly discovered their knack for comedy. In 2005, they joined YouTube and made several videos together, lip syncing the theme songs to Mortal Kombat, Power Rangers, and Teenage Mutant Ninja Turtles. At first, these videos were not intended to be posted online, but after they sent them to their friends, they started a YouTube channel.

One of Smosh's earliest videos, "Pokémon Theme Music Video," was released on November 28, 2005. It followed the same style as their other earlier videos, featuring the duo lip-synching the original English theme song for the Pokémon anime. However, the video instantly became much more popular than any of their other videos; over the course of its lifetime, it gained over 24 million views, becoming the most-viewed video on all of YouTube at that time. It held that title until it was dethroned by Judson Laipply's "Evolution of Dance". It was later removed for copyright.

The success of their Pokémon video and other videos led Smosh to be featured in the "Person of the Year: You" issue of Time, published December 13, 2006. Due to the channel's continued success, and Smosh's partnership with YouTube, the two recreated the video in November 2010, this time changing the words to be critical of The Pokémon Company taking down the Pokémon theme video.

2006–2012: YouTube success 

Over the course of the next few years, Smosh began to diversify. They started making short YouTube skits, such as their annual video series Food Battle and That Damn Neighbor. Smosh continued to grow in popularity and became one of the most subscribed channels on YouTube. In 2009, Smosh prepared a massive redesign of Smosh.com, added a games section, and put extras in the video section. In January 2010, Smosh launched the "Smosh Pit" feature, a blog that consists of various pieces of pop-culture trivia, and written comedy. In addition, 2010 saw the channel launch 3 different Smosh-based web series: Ian Is Bored, which started as a collection of comedic videos by Hecox, but then turned into both Hecox and Padilla making vlog like videos, and renamed Smosh Is Bored; Ask Charlie, where people ask Charlie, from their January 2010 Charlie the Drunk Guinea Pig video, random questions; and Lunchtime with Smosh, a comedy series featuring Smosh getting and eating food from various places, and answering Twitter questions from their fans on Twitter. Some of Smosh's most popular video series include Pokémon in Real Life and If  Was Real. Also in early 2010, Smosh created the "iShut Up App" for Android phones as part of a Google sponsorship; it eventually made its way to the iTunes app store. In 2011, the number of views grew by 40% when Smosh was acquired by Alloy Digital (later rebranded to Defy Media).

2012–2017: Expansion 

In 2012, the duo started three new YouTube channels, ElSmosh, with Smosh videos dubbed in Spanish, Shut Up! Cartoons, with various animated videos, and Smosh Games, with gaming-related content hosted alongside Mari Takahashi, David "Lasercorn" Moss, Matthew Sohinki, and Joshua "Jovenshire" Ovenshire. Some of Smosh's most popular videos are video-game themed music videos. These songs (along with other original songs) have been released in four albums to date – Sexy Album (2010), If Music Were Real (2011), Smoshtastic (2012), and The Sweet Sound of Smosh (2013). In January 2013, the Smosh channel surpassed Ray William Johnson in subscribers to become the most-subscribed YouTube channel for the third time. Smosh released Super Head Esploder X, a video game for iOS, in February 2013, and in July 2013 started an Indiegogo campaign for an iOS and PC game, Food Battle: The Game. Hecox and Padilla raised $258,777 to hire video game producers to create a game based on their characters and the foods used in their annual Food Battle series. Smosh donated 10% of the funds to three charities in November 2014, as well as releasing the game.

In February 2014, Smosh released a mobile app to access Smosh videos and other content from their website, and in late 2014 an Xbox One app. Later in 2014, a fan run channel Smosh France became an official Smosh channel. In March 2015, Smosh re-launched the Smosh Games Alliance, a multi-channel network where fans join to enjoy network benefits in exchange for a percentage of the ad revenue. In 2015, the duo announced Noah Grossman, Keith Leak Jr., Olivia Sui, Courtney Miller and Shayne Topp as new regular cast members for Smosh videos. A sketch series, called Every (Blank) Ever, has been released every two weeks since May 2015.

In January 2016, a web sitcom was launched on the main Smosh channel. Part Timers is a comedy-drama which takes place at a fictional children's arcade and pizza place called Pork E. Pine's, which takes inspiration from Hecox's first job at Chuck E. Cheese's. Each episode presents a challenge that the team must overcome to keep the business going. The series features regular Smosh cast members, Grossman (as Pete), Hecox (as Ian), and Padilla (as Anton), in addition to Cat Alter (as Mads), Jade Martz (as Ella), Casey Webb (as Dinger), and Natalie Whittle (as Lori). The series was released every Monday on the Smosh channel from January to May 2016. During the month of February, Ericka "Boze" Bozeman joined the cast of Smosh Games. Also that year, cast member Mari Takahashi was selected to participate on Survivor: Millennials vs. Gen X, though was the second player voted out.

2017–present: Ownership changes 
On June 14, 2017, Padilla announced he would be leaving Smosh to pursue independent video ventures due to a "lack in creative freedom". Hecox stated he would remain with Smosh, adding "I'm really looking forward to taking Smosh to the next phase, and we can't wait for people to see what we have coming up."

On November 6, 2018, Defy Media abruptly announced they were shutting down and laying off all its employees. Hecox said that Smosh was not "going away" and that plans were underway to find Smosh a new home. Padilla released a video the following day which went into more detail about his departure from Smosh and his issues with what Defy was doing with their employees and Smosh. He said that he and Hecox sold Smosh to Alloy Digital (which later became Defy Media) for stock, which had no monetary value because the company never went public. Padilla also expressed dissatisfaction with how Defy treated its employees and stated the company exploited them financially, took over his Facebook page, tried to take over his Twitter account, prevented him from joining the Screen Actors Guild, and that they had pressured them into starting a fundraiser for Food Battle: The Game before it had even been conceived, something that had at the time led to accusations of exploitation being levelled against himself and Hecox. He also explained that he had not previously shared this information because of worries that it would threaten the job security of his friends. On November 12, Smosh released an update video reaffirming that Smosh was searching for a new owner, and that in the meanwhile, content would continue to be released independently by the Smosh team. The cast clarified that they still had a significant amount of content from before Defy Media's shutdown in post-production. They also did not rule out the possibility of filming new content and releasing it independently, calling such an idea "old school", alluding to YouTube's early days when content was less commercialized.

On February 22, 2019, Mythical Entertainment acquired Smosh. This led to changes in the Smosh casts and crews, with some former members returning, while others have departed. Smosh is currently operating out of Mythical Entertainment's Los Angeles office.

Members

Current 
Main members
 Ian Hecox – Smosh (2005–present), Smosh Pit (2006–present), Smosh Games (2012–present)
 Courtney Miller – Smosh, Smosh Pit (2015–present), Smosh Games (2019–present)
 Shayne Topp – Smosh, Smosh Pit (2015–present), Smosh Games (2017–present)
 Damien Haas – Smosh (2019–present), Smosh Pit (2018–present), Smosh Games (2017–present)

Recurring members
 Keith Leak Jr. – Smosh, Smosh Pit (2015–present)
 Olivia Sui – Smosh, Smosh Pit (2015–present)
 Noah Grossman – Smosh, Smosh Pit (2015–present)
 Kimmy Jimenez – Smosh (2018–present), Smosh Pit (2019–present), Smosh Games (2019–present)
 Jacklyn Uweh – Smosh (2019–present), Smosh Pit (2020–present)
 Spencer Agnew – Smosh, Smosh Pit (2021–present), Smosh Games (2020–present)
 Tommy Bowe – Smosh, Smosh Pit (2019–present), Smosh Games (2018–present)
 Amanda Lehan-Canto – Smosh (2020–present), Smosh Pit (2022–present)

Former 
 Anthony Padilla – Smosh (2005–2017), Smosh Pit (2006–2017), Smosh Games (2012–2017)
 Matthew Sohinki – Smosh Games (2012–2017)
 Amra "Flitz" Ricketts – Smosh Games (2014–2018)
 Joshua "Jovenshire" Ovenshire – Smosh Games (2012–2018)
 Wesley "Wes" Johnson – Smosh Games (2014–2018)
 Ericka "Boze" Bozeman – Smosh Games (2017–2019)
 David "Lasercorn" Moss – Smosh Games (2012–2017, 2019–2020) 
 Mariko "Mari" Takahashi – Smosh Pit (2010–2017), Smosh Games (2012–2020) 
 Matt "Matthew" Raub – Smosh (2017–2022)
 Ify Nwadiwe – Smosh (2020–2021), Smosh Pit (2020–2021), Smosh Games (2020–2021)
 Sarah Whittle – Smosh (2017–2021), Smosh Games (2019–2021)
 Saige Ryan – Smosh, Smosh Pit, Smosh Games (2021–2022)

Timeline

Feature films 
On September 18, 2014, it was announced that a feature-length movie starring the duo was in development by AwesomenessFilms; it would be later titled Smosh: The Movie, and was released on July 24, 2015 by what is now known as 20th Century Studios Home Entertainment, and it’s now re-release by Universal Pictures Home Entertainment, with Netflix acquiring the film's streaming rights. Directed by Alex Winter from a story by Eric Falconer, it stars both Hecox and Padilla as fictionalized versions of themselves, alongside fellow YouTube personalities Jenna Marbles, Grace Helbig, Harley Morenstein, Mark Fischbach, Dominic Sandoval, and the Smosh Games crew, with Shane Dawson only appearing in the Unrated version. Padilla and Hecox also voiced the characters Hal and Bubbles respectively in The Angry Birds Movie, with Padilla returning for the sequel.
Additionally, Smosh also created the film Ghostmates for YouTube Premium that was released on December 14, 2016.

Damien Haas provided the voice of one of the protagonists in the video game, Fire Emblem Warriors: Three Hopes.

Channels 
Ten Smosh-related channels exist on YouTube, though only seven have scheduled content.

Main channels

Smosh 
Smosh is the original and main channel. It has over 25 million subscribers and 9.8 billion views. The channel is where the Smosh team posts sketches and other videos starring Ian Hecox, Noah Grossman, Keith Leak Jr., Courtney Miller, Olivia Sui, and Shayne Topp. Smosh has many complete and ongoing series which include:

 Main videos (2005–present)
 Music videos (2005–present)
 Charlie the Drunk Guinea Pig (2009–2012)
 If [Blank] Were Real (2009–2016)
 Every [Blank] Ever (2015–present)
 Food Battle (2006–2016)
 Behind the Scenes (2014–2016)
 Part Timers (2016) [2 Seasons]
 Smosh Live! (2016)
 Smoshtober (2016)
 Smosh Animated (2016)
 One Letter Off (2016–2017)
 The Big What If (2016–2017)
 This Week in Smosh (2017)
 You Posted That? (2017, 2019–2020)
 Smoffice (2019–present)
 Interviewing Exes (2021–present)
 RIP - The Funerals (2022–present)
 Idiots Present... (2022–present)
 Smosh: Under the Influence (live event) (2022)

Smosh Games 
Smosh Games uploads numerous videos a week, consisting of Let's Plays and video game commentary shows. When the channel was first created, Padilla and Hecox were the regular features of these videos; however, they began to appear less regularly on the channel overtime, with fellow Smosh Games members Mari Takahashi, Joshua "Joven" Ovenshire, David "Lasercorn" Moss, Matthew Sohinki, Amra "Flitz" Ricketts, Wesley "Wes" Johnson, Ericka "Boze" Bozeman and Damien Haas handling most hosting duties by 2017. The channel has over 7.3 million subscribers, and over 2.5 billion video views as of May 2021. Takahashi, Moss, Sohinki, Ovenshire, Ricketts, and Johnson also have their own channels, which are not considered part of the Smosh roster. From 2015 to 2019, the channel hosted annual "Smosh Summer Games" and "Smosh Winter Games" events, primarily hosted on the Smosh Games channel with other videos also posted to the Smosh 2nd Channel. The first Summer Games in 2015 introduced Shayne Topp to the Smosh family as a referee, while the 2017 Winter Games introduced Boze to the lineup. Damien Haas joined later in 2017. In August that year, Sohinki and Lasercorn announced that they would no longer be full-time members of Smosh Games, in order to focus on their new channel Toaster Ghost, and for Lasercorn to spend more time with his son. They have not ruled out appearing in future Smosh-related videos however, and have appeared occasionally in videos since then.

On January 4, 2018, Ricketts left the channel after being accused by multiple women of sexual assault and rape. After Ricketts' departure, the channel has not continued its yearly tradition of hosting Smosh Summer and Winter Games, and early in 2018, the channel's most consistently popular show, Game Bang, was paused indefinitely and was later implied to be cancelled.
The channel became inactive after Smosh's parent company, Defy Media, folded. However, it was confirmed in an episode of SmoshCast that the channel would resume with a Mortal Kombat video on April 13, with the main cast being more involved and Lasercorn returning to the fold. The video featured a lineup of Ian, Mari, Lasercorn, Courtney and Damien, with production staff Sarah Whittle and Matt Raub featuring in subsequent videos. Both Sarah Whittle and Matt Raub left Smosh in May 2021 & July 2022 respectively. It is currently unknown if any other former Smosh Games members would still be involved with the channel. In an April 2019 episode of SmoshCast, Jovenshire explained that he had not been an employee of Defy Media since May 1, 2018, and had been working freelance with Smosh Games since. However, he has reappeared in subsequent videos, including a Super Smash Bros. Ultimate competition on May 18, 2019. Mari and Lasercorn both left the channel in 2020 to launch New Element Six (NE6) with fellow Smosh Games alumni Flitz, Joven, Sohinki, and Wes. However, the group disbanded in mid-2020, and Mari later announced her move to Las Vegas. In 2022, Lasercorn, Jovenshire, Sohinki and Mari once again reunited to create OGSoG, a podcast YouTube channel.

Current and former Smosh Games shows 

 Gametime with Smosh [Later changed to Smosh Games] (2012–2016)
 Why We’re Single (2012–2014)
 Super Mari Fun Time (2012–2014)
 Backseat Gaming (2012–2014)
 Top 5 Fridays [Later shortened to Top 5] (2012–2015)
 Gamebang (2012–2018)
 Boss Fight of the Week (2012–2013)
 Smosh Games Reviews (2012–2013)
 Dope! or Nope (2012–2014)
 Gamer Nation [Later changed to PVP] (2012–2013)
 I Have a Raging Bonus [Later changed to Bonus Videos] (2012–2016)
 Smosh Action News Games Update Today [a.k.a. S.A.G.N.U.T.] (2012–2013)
 Smosh Games Vs. (2013)
 Cage Match Challenge (2013)
 Grant Theft Smosh (2013–2018)
 Let's Play Saturday (2013)
 16-Bit High School (2014)
 Honest Game Trailers (2014–2018) [Purchased by Fandom and moved to the Fandom Games channel]
 Maricraft (2014–2018; 2019–2020)
 Button Bash (2014–2015)
 Smosh Smash! (2015)
 Cell Outs (2015–2018)
 Friendly Fire (2016)
 Press Start (2016–2017)
 Reality Shift (2016–2017)
 Board AF (2016–present)
 Smosh Games Live (2017)
 The Damien and Shayne Show (2017)
 Smosh & Order (2018)
 Chaotic Gaming [Later changed to Gaming with a Twist] (2019–present)
 Courtney Plays Sims 4 (2019)
 Damien Breaks Games (2019)
 Stan Trivia (2020–present)
 Viva Smosh Vegas (2021)

Summer Games 
 Smosh Summer Games (2015)
 Smosh Summer Games: Camp (2016)
 Smosh Summer Games: Wild West (2017)
 Smosh Summer Games: We Blew It! (2018)
 Smosh Summer Games: Apocoalypse (2019)

Winter Games 
 Smosh Winter Games (2016)
 Smosh Winter Games... Again (2017)

Smosh Pit 
From Smosh Pit (originally named "IanH" and later Smosh 2nd Channel, and was used at first for vlogs and other non-scripted videos), Hecox and Padilla upload their side series Smosh is Bored on Mondays, while the rest of the team uploads vlogs on Thursdays, and Put It in My Mouth and Smosh's Seriously Super Stupid Sleepover on Saturdays. It has over 7.2 million subscribers and over 2.4 billion views. Smosh Pit Weekly was a series on the channel hosted by Mari Takahashi from April 2011 to August 2015, posted on Saturdays.

On July 28, 2017, Ian Hecox announced that Smosh 2nd Channel would be renamed "Smosh Pit" in the near future, and that Smosh Pit Weekly would be revived, with Mari Takahashi returning as host. Two other shows, WHOA! Nature Show, starring Courtney Miller and Olivia Sui, and One Hour Song Machine, starring Keith Leak Jr., were also announced.

The channel hosted a series "The Show w/ No Name", a weekly interactive series that features three members of the Smosh cast as hosts on rotation, with members of Smosh Games occasionally appearing alongside the main cast. The show features art drawn by the fans, along with questions submitted via Twitter for the cast to answer.

One of the most recent Smosh Pitseries is the popular ongoing "Try Not to Laugh" video series, in which the primary and/ or secondary Smosh cast (usually with at least one guest) perform various improvised scenarios directed at one cast member with a mouthful of water in an attempt to force them to spit it out. The most popular of these videos, as of June 2021, stands at 36.7 million views.

Current and former Smosh Pit shows 

 Ian is Bored [Later changes to Smosh is Bored] (2010–2017)
 Lunchtime with Smosh (2010–2017)
 Smosh Pit Weekly (2011–2015, 2017–2018)
 Squad Vlogs (2015–present)
 Put it in My Mouth (2015–2017)
 Seriously Super Stupid Sleepover (2015–2017)
 Smosh Lab (2016–2017)
 The Show with No Name (2016–2018)
 Try Not to Laugh (2017–present)
 What're Those?! [originally from Smosh Games] (2016–2017 SGA; 2017 SG; 2020–present)
 Day Jobs (2018)
 2 Truths 1 Lie Challenge (2018–2020)
 Eat It or Yeet It (2019–present)
 Spelling BEE-Kini Wax (2019)
 Ranked (2019)
 Hacking Off (2019)
 Beopardy (2020–present)
 Who Meme'd It? [originally from Smosh Games] (2021–present)
 Agree to Disagree (2022–present)

SmoshCast 
As a part of the Mythical Entertainment rebrand, a podcast titled SmoshCast was launched. Each Wednesday a new episode is released on iTunes with Ian Hecox, or occasionally Courtney Miller, hosting alongside cohosts from the Smosh family. The episode are then released in video format on Friday, censored for YouTube Ads. The channel took a hiatus in 2020, returning for just one episode after on May 4, 2021, to announce Sarah Whittle's departure from Smosh.

SmoshShorts 
SmoshShorts is where shorts originally uploaded in TikTok are re-uploaded in the channel.

ElSmosh 
On ElSmosh, the team uploads ElSmosh Pit de la Semana (Smosh Pit Weekly), Honest Game Trailers, a series from Smosh Games narrated in Spanish, and new Smosh episodes that have been dubbed over in Spanish. It has over 3.7 million subscribers. As of June 21, 2022, ElSmosh still uploads new content.

Smosh France 

Smosh France is a fan-run Smosh channel providing French subtitles for various Smosh videos. The channel has been inactive since January 2020.

Formerly associated channels

AnthonyPadilla 
AnthonyPadilla hosted vlogs uploaded by Padilla. Most videos uploaded prior to 2016 were removed when Padilla revived the channel to upload personal vlogs. It has over 5.3 million subscribers. Since Padilla's departure from Smosh in 2017, the channel is no longer associated with the Smosh brand.

Defunct or inactive channels

New AskCharlie 
AskCharlie, active from May 2010 to December 2011, hosts videos from the Ask Charlie series, where an anthropomorphic guinea pig, named Charlie the Drunk Guinea Pig, answers viewer submitted questions. It has over 321,000 subscribers.

Smosh Games Alliance 
The Smosh Games Alliance (SGA) channel was used for extra content for the Smosh Games crew. Originally it utilized fan-submitted gaming content, spotlighting it on the channel, and offered tutorials in "Smosh University". It continues to hosts more vlogs with the Smosh Games crew. It has over 249,000 subscribers. The channel has been inactive since December 2016.

Shut Up! Cartoons 
Shut Up! Cartoons uploads a number of animated series, created by different animators. It has over 2 million subscribers. The channel has been inactive since June 2017.

Discography

Studio albums

Awards and nominations

References

External links 

 

2002 establishments in California
2019 mergers and acquisitions
American comedy duos
American musical duos
American YouTube groups
Comedians from California
Comedy YouTubers
Let's Players
Music YouTubers
Number-one YouTube channels in subscribers
Performing groups established in 2002
Shorty Award winners
YouTube channels
YouTube channels launched in 2005
YouTube vloggers
American Internet groups